Gonska is a German surname of Slavic origin. Notable people with the surname include:

Mascha Gonska (born 1952), German film actress
Nadine Gonska (born 1990), German sprinter

German-language surnames